Posyolok Valuyevskoy Opytno-Meliorativnoy Stantsii is a rural locality (a settlement) in Novotikhonovskoye Rural Settlement, Staropoltavsky District, Volgograd Oblast, Russia. The population was 28 as of 2010. There are 2 streets.

Geography 
The settlement is located on the right bank of the Solyonaya Kuba, 16 km south of Staraya Poltavka (the district's administrative centre) by road. Peschanka is the nearest rural locality.

References 

Rural localities in Staropoltavsky District